Salaheddine Bassir (born 5 September 1972) is a Moroccan former professional footballer who played as a striker.

He played for a few clubs, including Raja Casablanca, Al-Hilal (Saudi Arabia) and Deportivo La Coruña in Spain with whom he won la liga and copa del rey. He then played for OSC Lille (France) and Aris Thessaloniki (Greece). He retired at the end of 2005 season.

Whilst at Lille Bassir scored a goal against Olympiacos in the UEFA Champions League and once against Borussia Dortmund in the UEFA Europa League.

He played for the Morocco national team and was a participant at the 1998 FIFA World Cup, where he scored two goals in the 3–0 win against Scotland. He also scored a brace against France during the Hassan II Trophy final.

Career statistics 
Scores and results list Morocco's goal tally first, score column indicates score after each Bassir goal.

References 

Living people
1972 births
Footballers from Casablanca
Moroccan footballers
Association football forwards
Morocco international footballers
La Liga players
Ligue 1 players
Super League Greece players
Raja CA players
Al Hilal SFC players
Deportivo de La Coruña players
Lille OSC players
Aris Thessaloniki F.C. players
1998 FIFA World Cup players
1998 African Cup of Nations players
2000 African Cup of Nations players
2002 African Cup of Nations players
Footballers at the 2000 Summer Olympics
Olympic footballers of Morocco
Moroccan expatriate footballers
Moroccan expatriate sportspeople in Saudi Arabia
Expatriate footballers in Saudi Arabia
Moroccan expatriate sportspeople in Spain
Expatriate footballers in Spain
Moroccan expatriate sportspeople in France
Expatriate footballers in France
Moroccan expatriate sportspeople in Greece
Expatriate footballers in Greece